Goa Rajiv Congress Party (GRCP), was a splinter group of Indian National Congress in Goa. It was founded in 1998 by Wilfred de Souza. It formed a coalition state government with Bharatiya Janata Party (BJP) and Maharashtrawadi Gomantak Party, with de Souza as Chief Minister. In the split from INC de Souza took with him several local branches of the Congress party and the entire Youth Congress and National Students Union of India (Congress student wing) branches in the state.

Ahead of the Goa assembly elections 1999 GRCP launched 14 candidates, out of whom two were elected (Wilfred de Souza and Francis D'Souza). In total the party received 36 570 votes. Shortly after the elections GRCP merged with Nationalist Congress Party. 

Francis de Souza left NCP to rejoin the INC November 5 same year. He later joined BJP.

References

See also
Indian National Congress breakaway parties
Wilfred de Souza

Defunct political parties in Goa
1998 establishments in Goa
Indian National Congress breakaway groups
Political parties established in 1998